Citizenship education may refer to:

 Citizenship education (immigrants), education intended to prepare noncitizens to become legally and socially accepted as citizens
 Citizenship education (subject), a subject taught in schools, similar to politics or sociology
 Citizenship Education is the process of enlightening and sensitizing people and their status as citizen, their right and duties as well as the need for them to work together with other citizen to develop their community.
 Citizenship education is a process of impacting on the citizen the acquisition of their right, value and development of total knowledge skill and attitude toward the affairs of their States.